Trucidocynodon is an extinct genus of ecteniniid cynodonts from Upper Triassic of Brazil. It contains a single species, Trucidocynodon riograndensis. Fossils of Trucidocynodon were discovered in Santa Maria Formation outcrops in Paleorrota geopark Agudo. T. riograndensis was similar to Ecteninion lunensis from the Upper Triassic Ischigualasto formation of Argentina, but differed in several respects, including its larger size. It is known from a nearly complete holotype skeleton as well as a referred skull. The holotype skeleton had an estimated length of 1.2 meters (4 feet), while the referred skull was 17% larger than that of the holotype. Trucidocynodon is considered one of the largest known carnivorous cynodonts from the Triassic, as well as one of the largest probainognathians in the entire Mesozoic.

A biomechanical study has argued that Trucidocynodon not only had erect limbs, but that it also possibly had digitigrade forelimbs, being among the first synapsids to show adaptations for cursoriality. However, it was likely not a specialized runner, unlike ungulates and some other modern cursorial mammals.

See also 

 List of therapsids

References

External links 
 Folha: Grupo acha fóssil de superpredador gaúcho com 220 milhões de anos (in Portuguese)
 Ciência Hoje:A nova fera do Rio Grande do Sul(in Portuguese)

Prehistoric probainognathians
Prehistoric cynodont genera
Monotypic prehistoric animal genera
Late Triassic synapsids of South America
Fossils of Brazil
Triassic Brazil
Paleontology in Rio Grande do Sul
Santa Maria Formation
Fossil taxa described in 2010